is a kata (a set of prearranged forms) in Judo. It is designed to teach the fundamental principles of judo, especially the principle of ju (yielding or gentleness).
It consists in three sets of techniques and is performed by a pair of people one acting as an Uke and the other a Tori.  The kata can be performed without wearing a judogi and, as it doesn't involve the completion of any throws, does not need to be performed in a dojo.

History
Ju-no-Kata was created by Jigoro Kano around 1887 when the number of people studying Judo had increased to the point where he could no longer advise everyone personally during free practice (randori).

Techniques 

 First Set
 Tsuki-dashi (Hand Thrust)
 Kata-oshi (Shoulder Push)
 Ryo-te-dori (Two-Hand Hold)
 Kata-mawashi (Shoulder Turn)
 Ago-oshi (Jaw Push)
 Second Set
 Kiri-oroshi (Downward Cut)
 Ryo-kata-oshi (Two-Shoulder Push)
 Naname-uchi (Slanting Strike)
 Kata-te-dori (One-Hand Hold)
 Kata-te-age (One-Hand Lift)
 Third Set
 Obi-tori (Belt Grab)
 Mune-oshi (Chest Push)
 Tsuki-age (Uppercut)
 Uchi-oroshi (Downward Strike)
 Ryo-gan-tsuki (Strike to Both Eyes)

Further reading
 Jigoro Kano, Kodokan Judo, Kodansha International.
 Keiko Fukuda, Ju No Kata: A Kodokan Judo Textbook, North Atlantic Books.

References

External links
 Judo Info: description of the techniques.

Videos of Ju-no-kata 
 Jigoro Kano - Ju-no-kata  Sequence of images. No narration or sound.
 Video of Ju-no-kata.  Filmed in 2006 at the World Masters in France.  Tori is Neirynck.  Uke is Istat.  No narration or sound.
 European Kata Championship 2010

Judo kata